John Jackson is an English television screenwriter.

Life and career 
After leaving Cambridge University, John Jackson developed and script edited the ITV soap Night and Day. Altogether he wrote 35 episodes for the TV Series. In 2009 he wrote the episode The King Is Dead, Long Live the King…  for the BBC One series Robin Hood. From 2010 to 2012 he wrote two episodes of the serial drama Lip Service. From 2011 until 2013 he wrote three episodes for the supernatural drama Being Human. This brought him a Writers' Guild of Great Britain award for Best TV Drama Series. He also wrote two episodes for the Being Human spin off Becoming Human.

In 2014 Jackson wrote an episode for another BBC Three series, In the Flesh. He would become a regular writer on ITV's Grantchester, and in 2020, was lead writer on season 3 of Sky's Riviera.

Filmography

Awards and nominations

Awards 
Writers' Guild of Great Britain Award:
 2012: Best TV Drama Series (Being Human)

References

External links

Living people
Year of birth missing (living people)
British television producers
British television writers
English television writers
English screenwriters
English male screenwriters
British male television writers
21st-century British screenwriters
21st-century English male writers